Hanönü, also Gökçeağaç, is a town in the Kastamonu Province in the Black Sea region of Turkey. It is the seat of Hanönü District. Its population is 2,111 (2021).

References

Populated places in Kastamonu Province
Hanönü District
Towns in Turkey